The Coussey Committee was established on 14 March 1949, after the 1948 Accra riots, to draft a constitution towards self-rule for the country Gold Coast. The committee was chaired by Sir Henley Coussey and published their report on 7 November 1949.

History 
The committee made provision for greater African representation in Government as there were increasing demands for a representative government by Gold Coasters. The Watson Commission had earlier recommended an extensive Legislative Assembly with more Ghanaian inclusive on 26 April 1948.

All the leaders of the UGCC were members of the committee except Kwame Nkrumah. He was considered a proponent of the British ideology, as his views of "independence now" were at variance with the United Gold Coast Convention (UGCC). His radical views led to his demotion to a treasurer in August 1948.

William Ofori Atta headed a committee convened at Saltpond later in June 1949 to settle the differences between Kwame Nkrumah and other UGCC members. The Committee on Youth Organization (CYO), the youth wing, insisted Nkrumah not reconciled with the intelligentsia. At the West Africa arena, he officially rejected the recommendations on 20 November 1949. Nkrumah declared the Coussey constitution as "bogus and fraudulent". A principal body, the Ghana Representative Council (ARC), was formed to initiate an appeal against the report.

This event led to Nkrumah breaking away from the UGCC. He later announced the formation of the Convention People's Party (CPP) on 12 January 1949 to attain his ideals of "self-government, now, now, now", which became their slogan. The CPP attacked both the colonial government and the UGCC.

Significance 

 It gave birth to the 1951 constitution.
 First all-African government

References 

1949 in Africa
Committees
Ghana–United Kingdom relations
History of Ghana
Politics of Ghana